De Lorenzo is an Italian surname. Notable people with the surname include:

 Leonardo De Lorenzo (1875–1962), Italian flautist
 Francesco De Lorenzo (born 1938), Italian physician and politician

See also 
 Lorenzo (disambiguation)
 di Lorenzo

Italian-language surnames
Patronymic surnames
Surnames from given names